Lindsey Beaven (born 1 January 1950) is a British former professional tennis player.

A right-handed player, Beaven represented Great Britain in the 1973 Wightman Cup. She twice reached the round of 16 at Wimbledon and was a doubles quarter-finalist at the 1974 Australian Open.

Beaven grew up in England, before relocating to the United States while competing on tour in the 1970s and has remained in her adopted country since, where she works as a therapist.

References

External links
 
 

1950 births
Living people
British female tennis players
English female tennis players
English emigrants to the United States